Templo de San Agustín is a church in Centro, Guadalajara, in the Mexican state of Jalisco.

External links

 

Churches in Mexico
Buildings and structures in Guadalajara, Jalisco
Centro, Guadalajara